OTTO Work Force/VOC Amsterdam is a women's handball club from Amsterdam-Noord in Netherlands that competes in the AFAB Eredivisie. They play their home matches in Sportshal Elzenhagen, which have capacity for 750 spectators. They usually play in green shirts and black shorts.

Honours 

 AFAB Eredivisie
 Winners(7) : 2000, 2008, 2009, 2010, 2017, 2018, 2019
 Dutch Cup
 Winners (4) : 2005, 2009, 2010, 2016
 Dutch Supercup
 Winners (3) : 2008, 2010, 2016

Arena 
Arena: Sportshal Elzenhagen
City: Amsterdam-Noord 
Capacity: 750
Address: JH Hisgenpad 1, 1025 WK Amsterdam

Team

Current squad 
Squad for the 2019-20 season.

Goalkeepers 
 1  Cajune Calmez
 12  Marit Huiberts
Field 
 3  Kaylee Romer
 4  Nikita van der Vliet 
 6  Britt van der Baan
 7  Sharon Bouter
 8  Zola Amsen
 10  Rachel de Haze 
 11  Maxime Drent
 14  Lindsey Schrekker
 15  Kim Lunter
 16  Zoe Sprengers

 18  Zara Zeldenthuis
 19  Lotte Visser
 20  Demy Worst
 22  Jessy Breugem
 23  Isa Ternede
 24  Kelsey van der Elst
 25  Beau de Boer
 26  Kirsten Theron
 27  Bente Goeman
 28  Eva van Diepen
 30  Tatum van Vliet
 31  Noah van der Heide

Transfers
Transfers for the 2020-21 season

 Joining
  Michelle Goos (LW) (from  Neckarsulmer SU)

 Leaving
  Nikita van der Vliet (P) (to  Nykøbing Falster Håndboldklub)
  Zoe Sprengers (LW) (to  Bayer Leverkusen)
  Rachel de Haze (LW) (Retires)

Former players 
  Estavana Polman
  Yvette Broch
  Tess Wester
  Laura van der Heijden
  Debbie Bont
  Angela Malestein
  Michelle Goos
  Charris Rozemalen
  Dione Housheer
  Bo van Wetering
 Rachel de Haze
 Nikita van der Vliet
Zoë Sprengers

External links
 Official website
 Club profile

Dutch handball clubs
Amsterdam-Noord